Honda Urban may refer to:

Honda Urban SUV Concept, 2013 concept subcompact crossover SUV based on Honda Vezel
Honda Urban EV Concept, a 2017 concept electric car